Regius Professor of Civil Law may refer to:

Regius Professor of Civil Law (Oxford)
Regius Professor of Civil Law (Cambridge)